Meningitis Now is a national charity based in the United Kingdom. It was formed following a merger between the charities The Meningitis Trust and Meningitis UK in 2013. Meningitis Now is working towards a future where no one in the UK dies from meningitis and everyone affected gets the support they need.

History 
Meningitis Trust was a charity formed in the United Kingdom in 1986 to fight meningitis.

Meningitis UK was originally called the Spencer Dayman Meningitis Laboratories in memory of founder and chief executive Steve Dayman's son, who died of meningitis and meningococcal septicaemia in 1982, aged 14-months. It was established in 1999 to fund a £500,000 dedicated meningitis research laboratory in the School of Medical Sciences at University of Bristol. Once this project was completed, the charity decided to focus solely on funding research into a preventative vaccine for all forms of meningitis.

In 2013, the Meningitis Trust and Meningitis UK merged and the new organisation was renamed Meningitis Now. Medical research is still at the heart of what they do, together with awareness raising and support.

Future challenges 
Vision 2020 sets out our goals and priorities through to 2020, moving Meningitis Now ever closer to a future where no one in the UK loses their life to meningitis and everyone affected gets the support they need. Without a vaccine to protect against all types of meningitis there is still much to do and Meningitis Now continues to counter the misconceptions that meningitis is a disease of the past and that it only affects babies and young children - in fact, anyone of any age can contract meningitis. Meningitis Now's goals remain to save lives and prevent disability through improving prevention and rapid diagnosis and rebuilding futures and improving quality of life through increased recognition of the impact of meningitis and the provision of timely, effective support.

Patrons 
Among the charity's patrons are:
• Lord Darzi
• The Duchess of Edinburgh
• Andrew Harvey
• Lord Williams of Oystermouth
• Ken Loach
• Lisa Snowdon
• Dr Ellie Cannon
• Ian Rush MBE
• Joanna Trollope CBE
• Denis Law
• Joe Swash

References

External links 
 
 BBC Radio 4

Health charities in the United Kingdom
Meningitis